Indirana longicrus is a species of frog found in the Western Ghats of India. It is only known from its type locality, Kempholey, Karnataka.

The habitat preferences of this species are not known, although it is possibly a forest species that presumably breeds like other members of the genus, with larvae being found on wet rocks next to streams.

Major threats
The area where it was collected, and might possibly still occur, is threatened by clearance for agricultural use.

References

longicrus
Frogs of India
Endemic fauna of the Western Ghats
Taxa named by C. R. Narayan Rao
Amphibians described in 1937